Granvin, also known as Eide, is a village in Voss Municipality in Vestland county, Norway. The village is located at the head of the Granvin Fjord in the southeastern part of the municipality.

Prior to 1 January 2020, the village was the administrative centre of the old Granvin Municipality which is now part of Voss Municipality.

Name

The village is known as Eide because it sits along a river on an isthmus of land between the fjord and the lake Granvinsvatnet. ("Eide" in Norwegian means isthmus.) The village is also known as Granvin since it is the municipal centre and largest settlement in the municipality of Granvin. Both names can be used interchangeably. This village and that farm area share the same name, but are two distinct locations in the municipality.

Transportation
Norwegian National Road 13 runs past the village, just to the north.  The entrance to the Vallavik Tunnel lies on the northern edge of the village.

Notable people
Notable people that were born or lived in Granvin include:
Thrond Sjursen Haukenæs (1840–1922), folklore collector and author

References

Villages in Vestland
Voss